The Fletcher Free Library is the public library serving Burlington, Vermont.  It is located at 235 College Street, in an architecturally distinguished Beaux-Arts building, constructed in 1902 with funding support from philanthropist Andrew Carnegie.  The building was listed on the National Register of Historic Places in 1976.

History
The Fletcher Free Library was established in 1873, endowed by Mary Martha Fletcher, the daughter of a local businessman.  It outgrew its initial building on Church Street by 1901. A new building was constructed in 1901–04 with funds provided by industrialist and philanthropist Andrew Carnegie, making it the first of the four Carnegie libraries in the state of Vermont.  It was designed in the Beaux-Arts style by Walter R. B. Willcox of Burlington, who won a competition to receive the commission.

The building had major settling problems in 1973 where it had been built over a filled-in ravine, and the library's collection was moved elsewhere. The possible razing of the building was stopped by a citizens' committee, which successfully had it added to the National Register of Historic Places, and a grant allowed the stabilization and repair of the building. A new modern addition was completed in 1981.

The largest public library in Vermont, the Fletcher Free Library had a budget of over $1 million in 2002. It circulated more books, had more visitors, and had more computers, than any other library in the state. In addition to its primary services as Burlington's public library, it is also a community center, a cultural resource for newly arrived immigrants to the Burlington area, and the city's only free public access computer center.

Architecture
The library is located just east of downtown Burlington, at the southeast corner of College Street and South Winooski Avenue.  The Carnegie building is a tall single-story structure, built of brick with terra cotta trim and resting on a granite foundation.  Its central bay projects, providing the building's original entrance beneath a gabled roof, while a larger hip-roof section projects to the rear.  It has rusticated brick corner pilasters and an elaborately detailed Corinthian cornice.  To the left, the modern three-story addition is attached to the rear left of the original building, and now provides the main entrance via a walkway between the two sections.

See also
National Register of Historic Places listings in Chittenden County, Vermont
List of Carnegie libraries in Vermont

References

External links

Official web site

National Register of Historic Places in Burlington, Vermont
Libraries on the National Register of Historic Places in Vermont
Beaux-Arts architecture in Vermont
Library buildings completed in 1902
Historic district contributing properties in Vermont
Buildings and structures in Burlington, Vermont
Libraries established in 1873
Carnegie libraries in Vermont